Przemysław Łudziński (born 3 February 1983 in Więcbork) is a Polish footballer who currently plays for Znicz Pruszków.

Career

Club
He is trainee of Rossa Rosnowo. Then he moved to Amica Wronki. Next he played for Ruch Chorzów. In the summer 2007, he moved to Śląsk Wrocław on loan and half year later was sold to this club from Ruch Chorzów. In 2009, he also plays for Piast Gliwice on loan.

In July 2011, he joined Znicz Pruszków.

References

External links
 

1983 births
Polish footballers
Amica Wronki players
Ruch Chorzów players
Śląsk Wrocław players
Stilon Gorzów Wielkopolski players
Znicz Pruszków players
Living people
People from Więcbork
Sportspeople from Kuyavian-Pomeranian Voivodeship
Association football forwards